Olve Grotle (born 17 February 1964) is a Norwegian politician.

He was elected representative to the Storting from the constituency of Sogn og Fjordane for the period 2021–2025, for the Conservative Party.

Grotle served as mayor in the municipality of Førde from 2011. He was the first mayor in the new muicipality of Sunnfjord from 2020, after the merge between Førde, Naustdal, Jølster and Gaular.

References

1964 births
Living people
Conservative Party (Norway) politicians
Sogn og Fjordane politicians
Mayors of places in Norway
Members of the Storting